Convergence: Courage in a Crisis is a 2021 British documentary film made for Netflix and directed by Orlando von Einsiedel. The film depicts the effects of the COVID-19 pandemic by following several different stories throughout eight countries. It was released on 12 October 2021. The film received a nomination for ‘Outstanding Current Affairs Film’ at the 43rd News & Documentary EMMYS

References

External links 
 
 

2021 films
2021 documentary films
British documentary films
2020s English-language films
2020s British films